Olur, formerly Tayotskar, Tavusker and Taoskari (meaning "Rock of Tayk"; , meaning "Gates of Tao"), is a town and district of Erzurum Province in the Eastern Anatolia region of Turkey. The mayor is Rüstem Polat (AKP). The population is 2,225 (as of 2010).

References

Populated places in Erzurum Province
Districts of Erzurum Province